Suramani is a village located in Surada Tehsil of Ganjam district in Odisha, India. It is situated 45 km away from sub-district headquarter Surada and 100 km away from district headquarter Chatrapur. Surada is nearest town to Suramani which is approximately 11 km away.

It is known for the weaver community residing in it. It is a religious villages with festivals & fairs celebrated around the year.

As per 2011 census, its population is 2,364 with 1,156 males and 1,208 females. The postal code of Suramani is 761107. The total geographical area of village is 335 hectares. There are about 513 houses in Suramani village.

External links 
 https://villageinfo.in/odisha/ganjam/surada/suramani.html

Villages in Ganjam district